Bahriye Tokmak (born 10 August 1960), better known by her stage name Kibariye, is a Turkish Arabesque-pop singer.

Life 
Kibariye was born Bahriye Tokmak on 10 August 1960 to a family with Romani origin, She is the daughter of Doğan and Makbule Tokmak and was born in Akhisar, Manisa. When she was born, her parents had not yet married, and her date of birth was initially recorded as 1959. In 1981, she applied to the court to correct her date of birth on registration and changed it to 1960.

In recent years, she appeared as a judge on ATV's singing competition Oryantal Star. Together with the Tepecik Philharmonic Orchestra, she performed at the 85th İzmir International Fair in 2016.

Personal life 
On 21 December 1979, she married the taxi driver Tunay Ürek. The couple got divorced after a few years. In 1999, she married Ali Küçükbalçık and together they have a daughter named Birgül.

Discography

Albums 
 Kimbilir (1981)
 Aşkın Adresi (1982)
 Gelin Ağıtı (1982)
 İşte Kibariye (1983)
 Hayat Merdiveni (1985)
 Kibariye (1986)
 Romanika (Sabredemedim) (1986 – Harika Müzik)
 Hançer (İyimserim) (1987)
 Sevmenin Bedeli (1987)
 Avustralya Konseri (1988)
 Arabesk'in Sultanı (1989)
 En Büyük Kibariye (1989)
 Aşk Çemberi (1990)
 Benim Şarkılarım (Bayşu – MER – Raks Müzik)
 Şarkılara Hayat Veren (1990)
 Aşkın Sesi (1991 – Bayşu Müzik)
 Bir Tutkudur (1992 – Bayşu Müzik)
 Kibariye '93 (1993 – Bayşu Müzik)
 İşte Ses İşte Yorum (1993 – Bayşu Müzik)
 Kibariye Fırtınası (1994 – Tempa Müzik)
 Bir Numara (1995 – Bayşu Müzik)
 Kül Kedisi (1995 – Tempa Müzik)
 Kara Kışlar (1996 – Banko Müzik Yapım)
 Bir Duygudur Kibariye (1998 – Prestij Müzik)
 Boyun Eğmem (2000 – Prestij Müzik)
 Yeniden (2001 – Prestij Müzik)
 Ben Ayakta Ağlarım (2003 – DSM – Tek Müzik)
 Gülümse Kaderine (2006 – Avrupa Müzik)
 Koleksiyon: Bir Numara (2008)
 Anlayamazsın (2008 – Avrupa Müzik)
 4 Mevsim (2010 – Avrupa Müzik)
 Gülü Soldurmam (2014 – Avrupa Müzik)

Filmography

References

External links 
 

1960 births
People from Akhisar
Turkish women singers
Turkish Romani people
Living people